Meyer C. Ellenstein (October 15, 1886 – February 11, 1967) served as mayor of Newark, New Jersey from 1933 to 1941.

Biography
Ellenstein was born in New York City on October 15, 1886, the son of Max Ellenstein and the former Libby Bzuroff.

Ellenstein assumed the office as mayor of Newark in 1933. He was a vocal critic of New York City Mayor LaGuardia's attempt to expand North Beach Airport (later known as LaGuardia Airport) for commercial flights.

Ellenstein's wife was one of three survivors of a TWA airplane crash in rural Pennsylvania in April 1936.

He died on February 11, 1967.

He was the father of actor Robert Ellenstein.

References

External links
Biographical information for Meyer C. Ellenstein from The Political Graveyard

1886 births
1967 deaths
Mayors of Newark, New Jersey
20th-century American politicians